Nicholas Parnell (born 1990) is the British winner of Style Wars, a television series which premiered on Fashion One Network in 2014. Style Wars was produced by Bigfoot Entertainment in 2013.

Style Wars and TV appearances 

In early 2013 Parnell took part in the international competition series Style Wars, which was produced by Bigfoot Entertainment for the Fashion One Television Network.  Parnell was announced the winner of the series in January 2014.

References 

1990 births
Living people
Fashion stylists